Neaetha catula is  a jumping spider species in the genus Neaetha that lives in East and Southern Africa. The male was first identified by Eugène Simon in 1886 and the female by Ludovico di Caporiacco in 1949.

References

Spiders described in 1886
Spiders of Africa
Salticidae
Taxa named by Eugène Simon